Gayle Joy Mayes (born 30 December 1956) is an Australian sprint and marathon canoeist who competed in the early 1990s. She was a member of Australian Women Canoeing team at the 1992 Summer Olympics in Barcelona and finished in 8th place at the K-4 500 m event.

She received a PhD in Tourism from the University of the Sunshine Coast in 2009. Since 2000, she is a lecturer at the University of the Sunshine Coast in Queensland, where she teaches in Tourism, Leisure & Events Management and Sport Marketing.

References

1956 births
Australian female canoeists
Canoeists at the 1992 Summer Olympics
Living people
Olympic canoeists of Australia